The 1960 British Columbia general election was the 26th general election in the Province of British Columbia, Canada. It was held to elect members of the Legislative Assembly of British Columbia. The election was called on August 3, 1960, and held on September 12, 1960. The new legislature met for the first time on January 26, 1961.

The conservative Social Credit of Premier W.A.C. Bennett was re-elected with a majority in the legislature to a fourth term in government despite losing seven percentage points of the popular vote and seven of its seats in the legislature.

The opposition Co-operative Commonwealth Federation increased both its share of the popular vote and its number of seats.

The British Columbia Liberal Party lost a small part of its popular vote, but managed to double its caucus from two to four members.

The Progressive Conservative Party doubled its share of the popular vote to almost 7%, but won no seats in the legislature.

Results

Note:

* Party did not nominate candidates in the previous election.

Results by riding

|-
||    
|align="center"|William Collins Speare<small>
|align="center"  |Cariboo<small>Social Credit
||    
||    
|align="center"  |Alberni<small>CCF
|align="center"|Stanley John Squire<small>
||    
|-
||    
|align="center"|William Kenneth Kiernan<small>
|align="center"  |Chilliwack<small>Social Credit
||    
||    
|align="center"  |Atlin<small>CCF
|align="center"|Frank Arthur Calder
||    
|-
||    
|align="center"|Richard Orr Newton<small>
|align="center"  |Columbia<small>Social Credit
||    
||    
|align="center" rowspan=2 |Burnaby<small>CCF
|align="center"|Cedric Cox
||    
|-
||    
|align="center"|Daniel Robert John Campbell
|align="center"  |Comox<small>Social Credit
||    
||    
|align="center"|Gordon Dowding
||    
|-
||    
|align="center"|Herbert Joseph Bruch
|align="center"  |Esquimalt<small>Social Credit
||    
||    
|align="center"  |Cowichan-Newcastle<small>CCF
|align="center"|Robert Martin Strachan2
||    
|-
||    
|align="center"|Ray Gillis Williston
|align="center"  |Fort George<small>Social Credit
||    
||    
|align="center"  |Cranbrook<small>CCF
|align="center"|Leo Thomas Nimsick
||    
|-
||    
|align="center"|Philip Arthur Gaglardi<small>
|align="center"  |Kamloops<small>Social Credit
||    
||    
|align="center" rowspan=2 |Delta<small>CCF
|align="center"|Camille Mather<small>
||    
|-
||    
|align="center"|Donald Frederick Robinson
|align="center"  |Lillooet<small>Social Credit
||    
||    
|align="center"|James Henry Rhodes
||    
|-
||    
|align="center"|Earle Cathers Westwood
|align="center"  |Nanaimo and the Islands<small>Social Credit
||    
||    
|align="center"  |Dewdney<small>CCF
|align="center"|Dave Barrett
||    
|-
||    
|align="center"|Wesley Drewett Black
|align="center"  |Nelson-Creston<small>Social Credit
||    
||    
|align="center"  |Grand Forks-Greenwood<small>CCF
|align="center"|Lois Haggen
||    
|-
||    
|align="center"|Lorne Shantz
|align="center"  |North Okanagan<small>Social Credit
||    
||    
|align="center"  |Kaslo-Slocan<small>CCF
|align="center"|Randolph Harding
||    
|-
||    
|align="center"|Jacob Francis Huhn
|align="center"  |North Peace River<small>Social Credit
||    
||    
|align="center"  |Mackenzie<small>CCF
|align="center"|Anthony John Gargrave
||    
|-
||    
|align="center"|Cyril Morley Shelford
|align="center"  |Omineca<small>Social Credit
||    
||    
|align="center"  |New Westminster<small>CCF
|align="center"|Rae Eddie
||    
|-
||    
|align="center"|William Harvey Murray
|align="center"  |Prince Rupert<small>Social Credit
||    
||    
|align="center"  |Revelstoke<small>CCF
|align="center"|George Hobbs
||    
|-
||    
|align="center"|Donald Leslie Brothers
|align="center"  |Rossland-Trail<small>Social Credit
||    
||    
|align="center" rowspan=2 |Vancouver East<small>CCF
|align="center"|Alexander Barrett MacDonald
||    
|-
||    
|align="center"|John Douglas Tidball Tisdalle
|align="center"  |Saanich<small>Social Credit
||    
||    
|align="center"|Arthur James Turner  
||    
|-
||    
|align="center"|Willis Franklin Jefcoat
|align="center"  |Salmon Arm<small>Social Credit
||    
||    
|align="center"  |Fernie<small>Liberal
|align="center"|Henry Cartmell (Harry) McKay
||    
|-
||    
|align="center"|Frank Richter, Jr.<small>
|align="center"  |Similkameen<small>Social Credit
||    
||    
|align="center" rowspan=2 |North Vancouver<small>Liberal
|align="center"|James Gordon Gibson
||    
|-
||    
|align="center"|Dudley George Little
|align="center"  |Skeena<small>Social Credit
||    
||    
|align="center"|Ray Perrault
||    
|-
||    
|align="center"|William Andrew Cecil Bennett1
|align="center"  |South Okanagan<small>Social Credit
||    
||    
|align="center"  |Oak Bay<small>Liberal
|align="center"|Alan Brock MacFarlane
||    
|-
||    
|align="center"|Stanley Carnell<small>
|align="center"  |South Peace River<small>Social Credit
||    
|-
||    
|align="center"|Eric Charles Fitzgerald Martin<small>
|align="center" rowspan=2 |Vancouver-Burrard<small>Social Credit
||    
|-
||    
|align="center"|Herbert Price<small>
||    
|-
||    
|align="center"|Alexander Small Matthew
|align="center" rowspan=2  |Vancouver Centre<small>Social Credit
||    
|-
||    
|align="center"|Leslie Raymond Peterson
||    
|-
||    
|align="center"|Thomas Audley Bate
|align="center" rowspan=3  |Vancouver-Point Grey<small>Social Credit
||    
|-
||    
|align="center"|Robert William Bonner
||    
|-
||    
|align="center"|Buda Hosmer Brown
||    
|-
||    
|align="center"|William Neelands Chant
|align="center" rowspan=3 |Victoria City<small>Social Credit
||    
|-
||    
|align="center"|Waldo McTavish Skillings
||    
|-
||    
|align="center"|John Donald Smith
||    
|-
||    
|align="center"|Irvine Finlay Corbett<small>
|align="center" |Yale<small>Social Credit
||    
|-
|
|align="center"|1 Premier-Elect
|align="center"|2 Leader of the Opposition
|-
|-
| align="center" colspan="10"|Source: Elections BC
|-
|}

See also
List of British Columbia political parties

Further reading
 

1960
1960 elections in Canada
1960 in British Columbia
September 1960 events in Canada